The 1936 Wake Forest Demon Deacons football team was an American football team that represented Wake Forest University during the 1936 college football season. In its fourth season under head coach Jim Weaver, the team compiled a 5–4 record and finished in ninth place in the Southern Conference with a 2–2 record against conference opponents.

Schedule

References

Wake Forest
Wake Forest Demon Deacons football seasons
Wake Forest Demon Deacons football